The 2022 World Athletics Race Walking Team Championships were the 29th edition of the global team racewalking competition organised by World Athletics.

Overview
New 35 km senior men's and women's races were introduced, instead of the 50 km race. The rest of the programme was unchanged, with senior men's and women's races over 20 km and junior category events for both sexes over 10 km.

Results

Men

Women

Medal table

Overall
Overall of the 12 events senior and junior (men and women).

Senior
Men and women's 4 events (individual and team)

Participants 
A total of 280 competitors from the national teams of the following 40 countries was registered to compete at 2022 World Athletics Race Walking Team Championships.

  (1)
  (12)
  (15)
  (4)
  (24)
  (6)
  (13)
  (1)
  (4)
  (6)
  (5)
  (12)
  (4)
  (6)
  (11)
  (1)
  (21)
  (7)
  (5)
  (5)
  (2)
  (5)
  (1)
  (6)
  (1)
  (13)
  (1)
  (7)
  (9)
  (3)
  (1)
  (7)
  (7)
  (6)
  (23)
  (1)
  (9)
  (1)
  (13)
  (1)

References

External links
 World Athletics competition page
 IAAF WORLD RACE WALKING TEAM CHAMPIONSHIPS - FACTS & FIGURES

World Athletics Race Walking Team Championships
World Race Walking Team Championships
World Athletics
International sports competitions hosted by Oman
Sport in Muscat, Oman
World Athletics